For the 1981 Tour de France, in late 1980, there were plans to make the tour "open", which meant that amateur teams would also be allowed to join. This would make it possible for teams from Eastern Europe to join. The plan did not materialize, so only professional teams were invited.
In January 1981, the organisation decided that there would be 15 teams with 10 cyclists, or 16 teams with 9 cyclists each. At that point, 16 teams had already submitted a request to join, and the organisation was in discussion with four additional Italian teams, and the American national team.

In the end, the American team did not apply, and the Italian teams decided to focus on the 1981 Giro d'Italia. The organisation selected 15 teams, who each selected 10 cyclists, for a total of 150 participants. The teams were:

Bernard Hinault, the winner of the 1978 and 1979 Tour de France and reigning world champion, was the main favourite. His knee problems, that caused him to leave the 1980 Tour de France, were solved, and he was in form: Hinault had won important races in the spring, and he had skipped the 1981 Giro d'Italia to focus on the Tour.
His main rivals were 1980 Tour de France winner Joop Zoetemelk, 1976 Tour de France winner Lucien Van Impe and Joaquim Agostinho, although they had never been able to beat Hinault when he was in form.

Freddy Maertens, the winner of the points classification in the Tour de France in 1976 and 1978, had won only three minor races in 1979 and 1980, but in 1981 he was selected again for the Tour.

Start list

By team

By rider

By nationality

References

1981 Tour de France
1981